DeSoto Parish School Board is a school district headquartered in Mansfield, Louisiana, United States. The current superintendent is Clay Corley.

Schools

PK-12 Combination Schools
 Pelican All Saints High School (Unincorporated area, closed due to budget cuts)
 Logansport High School (Unincorporated area)
 Stanley High School (Unincorporated area)

High schools
 Mansfield High School (Mansfield)
 North DeSoto High School (Stonewall)

Middle schools
 Mansfield Middle School (Grades 5–8) (Mansfield)
 North DeSoto Middle School (Grade 6–8) (Stonewall)

Elementary schools
 Mansfield Elementary School (Grades PK-4) (Mansfield)
 North DeSoto Lower Elementary School (Grades PK-1) (Stonewall)
 North DeSoto Upper Elementary School (Grades 2–5) (Stonewall)

References

External links
  https://www.desotopsb.com/

Education in DeSoto Parish, Louisiana
School districts in Louisiana
Educational institutions in the United States with year of establishment missing